Cassin's honeybird (Prodotiscus insignis), also known as Cassin's honeyguide, is a species of bird in the family Indicatoridae.

Range
Its range extends across the African tropical rainforest (also overlapping the Dahomey Gap).

References

Cassin's honeybird
Birds of the African tropical rainforest
Cassin's honeybird
Taxonomy articles created by Polbot